Saida Amoudi (born 1 January 1980) is a Moroccan para-athlete who specializes in throwing events. She represented Morocco at the 2020 Summer Paralympics.

2020 Tokyo Summer Paralympics
Amoudi won a bronze medal in the women's shot put F34 event. The athlete ranked third, making a throw of 8.21. The medal was the first for Moroccan athletes at the Tokyo Paralympics in 2021.

References

1980 births
Living people
Paralympic athletes of Morocco
Medalists at the World Para Athletics Championships
Athletes (track and field) at the 2016 Summer Paralympics
Athletes (track and field) at the 2020 Summer Paralympics
Medalists at the 2020 Summer Paralympics
Paralympic bronze medalists for Morocco
Paralympic medalists in athletics (track and field)
Moroccan female shot putters